The Severn River is a river in northern Ontario. The northern Ontario river has its headwaters near the western border of the province. Its source is Deer Lake and flows northeasterly into Severn Lake, then by a second section to Hudson Bay where it ends at Fort Severn.

The First Nation communities of Sandy Lake, Bearskin Lake, and Fort Severn are located along the river. These were formed at the sites of former trading posts built when the Severn River was a prominent river during the fur trade era.

The mouth of the river was located by the English in 1631 during expeditions by captains Thomas James and Luke Foxe. Later, Fort Severn was established there as a trading post in 1689 by the Hudson's Bay Company. It was captured by Pierre le Moyne, sieur d'Iberville in 1690. The post, rebuilt in 1759, has been in continuous operation to this day making this community one of the oldest European settlements in Ontario.

At its source on Deer Lake is the small community of Deer Lake, Ontario.

Tributaries
Tributaries of the northern Severn River include:
McInness River
Cobham River (source in Manitoba)
Windigo River
Makoop River
Blackbear River
Sachigo River
Wapaseese River
Beaver Stone River
Fawn River
Beaver River

See also
List of longest rivers of Canada
List of Ontario rivers

References

Rivers of Kenora District
Tributaries of Hudson Bay